The Yeovil Railway Centre is a small railway museum at Yeovil Junction on the L&SWR West of England Main Line between Salisbury and Exeter in the U.K.

It was created in 1993, in response to British Rail's decision to remove the turntable from Yeovil Junction. Approximately ¼ mile of track along the Clifton Maybank spur is used for demonstration trains.

Description
The site contains a G.W.R. transfer shed built in the 1860s, which was erected to facilitate the transfer of goods from  broad gauge to  standard gauge freight wagons. This is the last remaining shed of its type on its original site and has been converted to a visitor centre. The site also has an S.R. turntable and a 15,000 gallon water tower. These have been restored to working order for the servicing of steam locomotives. An engine shed was built and opened in 1999.

Events 
The centre holds regular events including Train Days where steam train rides are operated, using a brake van down the Clifton Maybank spur, and the turntable is demonstrated. Often there are additional attractions on site such as a miniature railway, shed tours, model railway and art gallery.  Other events include the Train & Tractor Day and Santa Specials.

Mainline steam excursions to Exeter or Weymouth often call here for the locomotive to be turned and serviced.

Stock List

Steam locomotives
 Peckett  Pectin. Operational, returned to service March 2022.
Andrew Barclay  Lord Fisher. Operational.

Diesel Locomotives
 British Rail Class 50 50050 Fearless (Privately Owned). Left 2015
 Ruston & Hornsby  Shunting engine
 Fowler  "Cockney Rebel"
 Fowler  "Sam"

External links 
 Official site

References 

Heritage railways in Somerset
Buildings and structures in Yeovil
Museums in Somerset
Railway museums in England